George Cooke may refer to:
 Sir George Cooke, 3rd Baronet (1662–1732), British MP for Aldborough, 1698–1700
 George Cooke (died 1768), British MP for Middlesex and Tregony
 George Cooke (Australian politician) (1869–1938), member of the South Australian House of Assembly for Barossa
 George Cooke (barrister) (1645–1740), subject of a statue by Sir Henry Cheere, 1st Baronet
 George Cooke (British Army officer) (1768–1837), Major-General commanding the British 1st Division at the Battle of Waterloo
 George Cooke (Deputy Governor of Bombay), Deputy Governor of Bombay, 1689–1690
 George Cooke (engraver) (1781–1834), British engraver
 George Cooke (Massachusetts politician) (died 1652), Massachusetts colonial politician
 George Cooke (painter) (1793–1849), American painter
 George Cooke (rower) (1906–1941), New Zealand Olympic rower
 George A. Cooke (1869–1938), chief justice of the Illinois Supreme Court, 1913–1914
 G. A. Cooke (George Albert Cooke, 1865–1939), Anglican clergyman and academic
 George Atwell Cooke, Ontario lawyer and political figure
 George Edwin Cooke (1883–1969), American Olympic football (soccer) player 
 George Frederick Cooke (1756–1812), English actor
 George Leigh Cooke (c. 1779–1853), mathematician and priest
 George W. Cooke (1916–1992), British chemist
 George Willis Cooke (1848–1923), Unitarian minister, writer, editor, and lecturer
 George Wingrove Cooke (1814–1865), British lawyer and historian

See also
 George Coke (1570–1646), or Cooke, English bishop
 George Cook (disambiguation)